Arron Monk (born 15 April 1990) is an English professional darts player who competes in Professional Darts Corporation (PDC) events. He is the son of fellow former professional darts player and the 1996 Winmau World Masters winner Colin Monk.

Career
Monk came to prominence with a group of young darts players at the 2010 UK Open which included Joe Cullen, William O'Connor and Reece Robinson. He defeated Nick Fullwell in the second round, whilst being cheered on by his father. In the third round, however he was defeated by the in-form Denis Ovens, who went on to reach the semi-final.

Monk also competed on the PDC Pro Tour and won the New Kids on the Oche event – Nuts TV's last televised darts tournament – in 2008.

On 3 January 2011, he won the final of the PDC Under-21 World Championship against Michael van Gerwen, played before the final of the 2011 PDC World Darts Championship. As a result of reaching the final, he qualified for the 2011 Grand Slam of Darts.

2012 season
Monk qualified for his first PDC World Championship in 2012 by beating Joe Cullen in the PDPA Qualifier. He was perhaps unlucky with the draw for the first round as he played the winner of the previous weeks Players Championship Finals, Kevin Painter, and was beaten 3–1. In April, he earned a place in the Austrian Darts Open in Vienna by defeating Paul Barham and Daniel Day in the UK qualifier. He played Raymond van Barneveld in the first round and lost 6–4. At the UK Open Monk enjoyed a 9–8 victory over Painter, before losing to Paul Nicholson 9–3 in the last 32. He also qualified for the third European Darts Open with wins over Jack Hill and Chris Mason, but lost to Steve Brown 6–2 in the first round in Düsseldorf. In October, Monk reached the semi-finals of a PDC event for the first time at the 13th Players Championship of the year. He defeated the likes of Dennis Priestley, Roland Scholten and Mark Webster, all of whom have won major titles in the past, before losing 6–1 to Michael van Gerwen. Monk then saw off John Part, Vincent van der Voort and Andy Hamilton, to make the quarter finals of the firth European Tour Event of the year, the Dutch Darts Masters. Monk faced Paul Nicholson and lost 6–1 with an average of just 69.39.
Monk qualified for the 2012 Grand Slam of Darts by finishing top of the PDC Unicorn Youth Tour Order of Merit. He won two of his three group games to finish second in the table and qualify for the last 16 of a major tournament for the first time. He played Dean Winstanley and was beaten 10–5.

2013 season
Monk reached his second World Championship by finishing 35th on the 2012 ProTour Order of Merit, claiming the fifth of sixteen spots that were awarded to non-qualified players. He lost 3–0 to Peter Wright in the first round. Monk was ranked world number 45 after the event. At the UK Masters he defeated Ian White and Mark Walsh both 6–4, before missing one match dart in the third round against Robert Thornton to lose 6–5. He was beaten 6–4 by Ricky Evans in the semi-finals of the Under-21 World Championship, and lost 5–2 to Gaz Cousins in the second round of the UK Open. In total he reached the last 16 stage four times during the year but could not advance beyond this stage.

2014 season
Monk was beaten 3–0 by Justin Pipe in the first round of the 2014 World Championship as he lost each set by three legs to one with an average of just 78.64. He lost 5–4 to Karl Merchant in the second round of the UK Open. Monk had a disappointing year as he couldn't get beyond the last 32 of any event. The only European Tour event he could qualify for was the Austrian Darts Open and he was beaten 6–1 by Stephen Bunting in the first round.

2015 season
Monk received a ban from the DRA for reckless throwing of darts and did not play in an event until September 2015 and only won two matches in the nine tournaments he entered. He dropped to 145 in the world at the end of the year and could not win his place back on tour via Q School.

2016 season
Monk qualified for the 2016 UK Open and defeated Stewart Rattray 6−3 and Robert Thornton 6−4, before losing 9−5 to Phil Taylor in round three. He was knocked out in the semi-finals of the 13th Challenge Tour event by Michael Barnard, but went one better later in the day at the 14th event by reaching the final where he lost 5−1 to Richie Burnett.

World Championship results

PDC

 2012: First round (lost to Kevin Painter 1–3)
 2013: First round (lost to Peter Wright 0–3)
 2014: First round (lost to Justin Pipe 0–3)
 2020: First round (lost to Jose Justicia 0–3)

Performance timeline

PDC European Tour

References

External links

Arron Monk profile at Unicorn-darts
Management Website

Living people
Professional Darts Corporation current tour card holders
People from Andover, Hampshire
English darts players
1990 births
PDC world youth champions